Louis Ziskin (born October 17, 1969) is CEO and founder of DropIn, Inc. an on-demand live video platform catering at launch to the insurance and automotive industries.

Early life
In 1998, Ziskin became a major importer of the drug 3,4 methylenedioxymethamphetamine (more commonly known as ecstasy) in Los Angeles, running a large smuggling operation that imported the drug to the United States via Europe.

Ziskin was taken into custody in December 7, 2000 and charged in CR 00-24(D)-RSWL, for transactions beginning in November 1999 and continuing up until the seizures of December 22, 1999. Ziskin was convicted of smuggling 700 pounds of ecstasy into Southern California via FedEx and other various shipping companies, the largest-ever United States government seizure of the drug and subsequently sentenced to a term of imprisonment.

On December 14, 2000, Ziskin was charged in an indictment in the case CR 00-852(D)-CAS, stemming from drug-trafficking actions that took place between January 2000 and September 2000. Following his incarceration, Ziskin lost a double jeopardy appeal for the second indictment CR 00-852(D)-CAS. The government settled all claims against Ziskin for a 188-month sentence and a 9 million dollar fine.

DropIn
DropIn, Inc. is a remote on-demand video inspection platform that creates live video feeds of any place in the world, at any time. The service caters to the insurance and automotive industries.

Philanthropy
In the time since his incarceration and subsequent release, Ziskin is a frequent public speaker lecturing about anti-recidivism and addiction recovery. He also gives regularly to organizations that contribute to addiction education.

References

External links

 DropIn, Inc website

1969 births
Jewish American philanthropists
Living people
21st-century American Jews